Cleveland is a neighborhood in the Camden community in Minneapolis. Its boundaries are Dowling Avenue to the north, Penn Avenue North to the east, Lowry Avenue north to the south, and Xerxes Avenue North to the west. To the west of Xerxes Avenue is the suburb of Robbinsdale. Some people believe that the neighborhood is named after former United States President Grover Cleveland, while others maintain it is named after Horace Cleveland, a landscape architect who framed the development of the Minneapolis Park System in the 1880s.

It contains the Fournier House.

References

External links

Minneapolis Neighborhood Profile - Cleveland

Neighborhoods in Minneapolis